of Japan, a journalist, businessman and mountaineer, served on the World Scout Committee of the World Organization of the Scout Movement and was the sixth President of the Boy Scouts of Japan, contributing to the success of the 13th World Scout Jamboree held August 2 to 10, 1971 on the western side of Mount Fuji.

Background
Matsukata was son of the early Meiji Period Finance Minister and genrō, Matsukata Masayoshi.

In 1972, Matsukata was awarded the Bronze Wolf, the only distinction of the World Organization of the Scout Movement, awarded by the World Scout Committee for exceptional services to world Scouting. In 1973 he posthumously received the highest distinction of the Scout Association of Japan, the Golden Pheasant Award.

An experienced mountaineer and lifelong alpinist, Matsukata led Japan's 39-person expedition to Mount Everest in 1970.

See also

List of 20th-century summiters of Mount Everest

References

Further reading
Dr. László Nagy, 250 Million Scouts, The World Scout Foundation and Dartnell Publishers, 1985, complete list through 1981

External links
 Archived copy

 

1899 births
1973 deaths
Recipients of the Bronze Wolf Award
World Scout Committee members
Scouting in Japan
Saburo
Chief Scouts